An alphabetic list of prose writers and poets from the nation of Georgia.

A
Alexander Abasheli, 1884–1954, Russian E/USSR, poet and non-fiction writer
Grigol Abashidze, 1914–1994, USSR/Georgia, poet
Irakli Abashidze, 1909–1992, Russian E/USSR, poet and non-fiction writer
Alexander Amilakhvari, 1750–1802, Georgia, non-fiction writer
Chabua Amirejibi, 1921–2013, USSR/Georgia, fiction and non-fiction writer
Manana Antadze, born 1945, USSR/Georgia, writer and translator
Shio Aragvispireli, 1867–1926, Russian E/USSR, non-fiction writer
Archil of Imereti, 1647–1713, Georgia, poet
Lavrenti Ardaziani, 1815–1870, Russian E, fiction and non-fiction writer
Lado Asatiani (1917–1943, USSR, poet

B
Gerzel Baazov, 1904–1938, Russian E/USSR, poet and playwright
Nikoloz Baratashvili, 1817–1845, Russian E/Azerbaijan, poet
Vasil Barnovi, 1856–1934, Russian E/USSR, fiction writer
Elena Botchorichvili, living, USSR/Canada, fiction and non-fiction writer
Lasha Bugadze, born 1977, USSR/Georgia, fiction writer and playwright
Zaza Burchuladze, born 1973, USSR/Germany, fiction writer and playwright
Besiki, 1750–1791, Georgia, poet and non-fiction writer, pseudonym of Besarion Zakarias dze Gabashvili

C
Chakhrukhadze, fl. late 12th/early 13th c., Georgia, poet
Irakli Charkviani, 1961–2006, USSR/Georgia, poet and non-fiction writer
Alexander Chavchavadze, 1786–1846, Russian E, poet
Ilia Chavchavadze, 1837–1907, Russian E, non-fiction writer and poet
Simon Chikovani, 1902–1966, Russian E/USSR, poet
Otar Chiladze, 1933–2009, USSR/Georgia, fiction writer
Tamaz Chiladze, 1931–2018, Russian E/Georgia, playwright and poet
Daniel Chonkadze, 1830–1860, Russian E, fiction writer

D
Aneta Dadeshkeliani, 1872–1922, Russian E, poet and educator 
Nino Dadeshkeliani, 1890–1931, Russian E/France, writer and politician
Demetrius I of Georgia, c. 1093–1156, Georgia, monarch and poet
David Dephy, born 1968, Georgia/US, poet
Nodar Dumbadze, 1928–1984, USSR, fiction writer
Guram Dochanashvili, 1939–2021, USSR/Georgia, fiction/non-fiction writer

E
Nana Ekvtimishvili (born 1978), Georgia, writer and film director
Dominika Eristavi (1864–1929), Russian E/USSR, writer and translator
Giorgi Eristavi (1813–1864), Russian E, dramatist, poet and non-fiction writer
Rapiel Eristavi (1824–2001), Russian E/USSR, poet, fiction writer and dramatist
Anastasia Eristavi-Khoshtaria (1868–1951), Russian E/USSR, feminist novelist

G
Ekaterine Gabashvili (1851–1938), Russian E, fiction and non-fiction writer
Konstantine Gamsakhurdia (1893–1975), Russian E/USSR, fiction writer
Zviad Gamsakhurdia (1939–1993), USSR, non-fiction and fiction writer
Mirza Gelovani (1917–1944), USSR, poet
Naira Gelashvili (born 1947), USSR/Georgia, fiction and non-fiction writer
George the Hagiorite (1009–1065), Georgia, non-fiction writer
Iakob Gogebashvili (1840–1912), Russian E, non-fiction and children's writer and poet
Parsadan Gorgijanidze (1626 – c. 1696), Georgia, non-fiction writer
Levan Gotua (1905–1973), Russian E/USSR, fiction writer
Terenti Graneli (1897–1934), Russian E/USSR, poet and essayist, pseudonym of Terenti Kvirkvelia
Ioseb Grishashvili (1889–1965), Russian E/USSR, poet and non-fiction writer, pseudonym of Ioseb Mamulishvili
Petre Gruzinsky (1920–1984), USSR, poet

H
Nino Haratischwili (born 1983), Georgia/Germany, novelist and playwright

I
Paolo Iashvili (1894–1937), Russian E/USSR, poet
Ioane Petritsi (c. 11th c.), Georgia, philosopher
John Zosimus (died c. 990), Georgia, religious writer
Otia Ioseliani (1930–2011), USSR/Georgia, fiction and drama

J
Mikheil Javakhishvili (1880–1937), Russian E/USSR, novelist

K
Zurab Karumidze (born 1957), USSR/Georgia, fiction and non-fiction writer
Alexander Kazbegi (1848–1893), Russian E, novelist
Ana Kalandadze (1924–2008), USSR/Georgia, poet 
Mariam Khutsurauli (born 1960), USSR/Georgia, poet and short story writer
Leo Kiacheli (1884–1963), Russian E/USSR, fiction and non-fiction writer
Lali Kiknavelidze (born 1969), USSR/Georgia, screenwriter and film director
David Kldiashvili (1862–1931), Russian E/Georgia, fiction writer and dramatist
Sergo Kldiashvili (1893–1886), Russian E, fiction writer and dramatist
Ana Kordzaia-Samadashvili (born 1968), USSR/Georgia, novelist and literary journalist
Nestan Kvinikadze (born 1980), USSR/Georgia, scriptwriter and dramatist

L
Giorgi Leonidze, (1899–1966), Russian E/USSR, poet and non-fiction writer
Niko Lomouri, (1852–1915), Russian E, poet

M
Mukhran Machavariani (1929–2010), USSR/Georgia, poet
David Magradze (born 1963), USSR/Georgia, poet
Tamta Melashvili (born 1979), USSR/Georgia, novelist and feminist 
Giorgi Merchule (10th c. CE), Georgia, biographer
Kato Mikeladze (1878–1942), Russian E/France, journalist and feminist
Ephrem Mtsire (died c. 1101/1103), Georgia, non-fiction writer
Aka Morchiladze (born 1966), USSR/Georgia, fiction and non-fiction writer, pseudonym of Giorgi Akhvlediani

N
Kolau Nadiradze (1895–1990), Russian E/Georgia, poet

O
Alexander Orbeliani (1802–1869), Russian E, p/f/nf
David Orbeliani (1739–1796), Georgia, poet
Grigol Orbeliani (1804–1883), Russian E, poet
Sulkhan-Saba Orbeliani (1658–1725), Georgia/Russian E, non-fiction writer
Vakhtang Orbeliani (1812–1890), Russian E, poet
Iza Orjonikidze (1938–2010) USSR/Georgia, poet and scholar

P
George Papashvily (1898–1978), Russian E/US, non-fiction writer
Tamri Pkhakadze (born 1957), Georgia, novelist and children's writer
Vazha-Pshavela (1861–1915), Russian E, poet and fiction and non-fiction writer, pseudonym of Luka Razikashvili

R
Guram Rcheulishvili, 1934–1960, Russian E, fiction and non-fiction writer
Grigol Robakidze, 1880–1962, Russian E/Switzerland, non-fiction writer and poet
Shota Rustaveli, c. 1160 – c. 1120, Georgia, poet

S
Nino Salia (1898–1992), Russian E/France, historian
Irma Shiolashvili, born 1974, USSR/Georgia, poet, translator and journalist
Stepane Mtbevari, fl. 10th c., Georgia, religious writer

T
Galaktion Tabidze, 1892–1959, Russian E/USSR, poet
Titsian Tabidze, 1890–1937, Russian E/USSR, poet
Nicholas Tchkotoua, 1909–1984, Russian E/Switzerland, novelist
Ekaterine Togonidze, born 1981, USSR/Georgia, journalist and novelist
Elena Topuridze, 1922–2004, USSR/Georgia, philosopher and non-fiction writer 
Avksenty Tsagareli, 1857–1902, Russian E, dramatist
Akaki Tsereteli, 1840–1915, Russian E, poet
Mariam Tsiklauri, born 1960, Russian E, poet and children's author
Iakob Tsurtaveli, fl. 5th century CE, non-fiction writer
Anastasia Tumanishvili-Tsereteli, 1849–1932, Russian E/USSR, writer and educator
David Turashvili, born 1966, USSR/Georgia, fiction writer

V
Vakhtang VI of Kartli, 1675–1737, Georgia, non-fiction writer and poet
Elene Virsaladze, 1911–1977, Russian E/USSR, non-fiction writer

See also
Republic of Georgia
Culture of Georgia

Georgian
 
Writers